The following is a list of Oricon number-one singles of 1997.

Oricon Weekly Singles Chart

References 

1997 in Japanese music
Japan Oricon
Oricon 1997